James Mack Gladden (May 22, 1909 – March 1985) was a professional American football player for the St. Louis Gunners. He played for the Gunners in 1932 and 1933, while the team still played independently of any league. He also played for the team in 1934, when they were short-lived members of the National Football League. Prior to his professional career, Gladden played college football, while attending the University of Missouri. He was a two-time letterman for the school in 1929 and 1931.

References

External links

1909 births
1985 deaths
St. Louis Gunners players
Missouri Tigers football players
Players of American football from Missouri
People from Texas County, Missouri
American football ends
American football tackles